The Central District of Jahrom County is a district (bakhsh) in Jahrom County, Fars Province, Iran. At the 2006 census, its population was 124,134, in 30,613 families.  The District has one city: Jahrom. The District has two rural districts (dehestan): Jolgah Rural District and Kuhak Rural District.

References 

Jahrom County
Districts of Fars Province